Raffaëla Paton (born 1 June 1983) is a Dutch singer of Surinamese descent and the winner of the 2006 Dutch talent show Idols. Paton participated in the Netherlands national selection for the Eurovision Song Contest 2012 in Baku, Azerbaijan with her entry Chocolatte but did not win.

Biography
Paton moved to Assen when she was a little girl. Her mother was a famous singer in Suriname. Paton's aunt is Ruth Jacott, also a famous Dutch singer who represented the Netherlands in the Eurovision Song Contest of 1993. Before she participated in Idols, she worked as a hostess in a restaurant in Emmen.

11 March 2006 was a big day for Paton; The grand finale of "Idol 2006", the Dutch adaption of the hit reality TV show Pop Idol. Paton won Idols with 58% of the total votes, beating favourite Floortje Smit. After the show, RTL 4, the broadcaster of Idols, reported that Floortje was winning the contest, until Paton sang "Right Here, Right Now (My Heart Belongs to You)", which was going to be the debut single of the winner of Idols. The song is a cover of Agnes Carlsson, the Swedish Pop Idol.

On 21 April 2006 Paton's debut album Raffaëla was released. The album contains 12 songs she sang during her Idols career and two new songs about pregnancy. The album debuted at #1 in the Dutch Album Top 100.

On 24 August 2006 Paton delivered her first daughter, named Beautiful Hope.

Performances on Idols III
Audition: India.Arie - Beautiful Surprise
Theater (trio rounds): Patti LaBelle - Lady Marmalade (trio)
Theater (duo rounds): Eternal & Bebe Winans - I Wanna Be the Only One
Theater (solo rounds): Alicia Keys – If I Ain't Got You
Workshops: The Trammps - Disco Inferno
1st Liveshow: Lionel Richie - All Night Long (All Night)
2nd Liveshow: Ilse DeLange - I'm Not So Tough
3rd Liveshow: Mary Wells - My Guy
4th Liveshow: Alannah Myles - Black Velvet
5th Liveshow: Blu Cantrell - Hit 'em Up Style
6th Liveshow: L.T.D. - Back in Love Again
7th Liveshow:
Roger Glover & Guests - Love is all
Mariah Carey - Dreamlover
8th Liveshow:
Trijntje Oosterhuis & Marco Borsato - Wereld Zonder Jou
De Dijk - Ik Kan Het Niet Alleen
9th Liveshow:
En Vogue - My Lovin' (You're Never Gonna Get It)
Nat King Cole - Straighten up and Fly Right
10th Liveshow:
Aretha Franklin - Think (Freedom)
De Poema's - Mijn Houten Hart
The Pussycat Dolls - Don't Cha
Finale:
Aretha Franklin & Eurythmics - Sisters Are Doin' It for Themselves (duet with Floortje)
The Trammps - Disco Inferno
Elvis Presley - Don't Be Cruel
Agnes Carlsson - Right Here, Right Now (My Heart Belongs to You)

After Idols

After a time off to care for her daughter, Paton reappeared as one-third of girlgroup Monroe. Their single "The Real Thing" peaked at #40 on the Dutch Singles Chart, and then dropped again.

After this, Paton decided to prove herself again in the TV smash The Voice of Holland, where she reached the liveshows and became part of the final 24 contestants. She was mentored by Jeroen van der Boom.

In The Voice of Holland
Paton also auditioned for the inaugural season 1 of the Dutch reality television show The Voice of Holland. In day 3 of the vblind auditions, she sang "Mercy from Duffy with three of the four chairs turning (Jeroen van der Boom, Nick & Simon and  Roel van Velzen and she picked to be on Team Jeroen.

In the battle round, Jeroen faced her with Anne Schellekens both singing "Beautiful Liar" and passed to the live shows where she sang "Bad Romance" and was saved by the public vote. In live show 6 she sang "The Way You Make Me Feel" but was eliminated finishing  13th to 16th overall.

Nationaal Songfestival 2012
Paton participated in the Nationaal Songfestival 2012, the Netherlands national selection for the Eurovision Song Contest 2012 in Baku, Azerbaijan with her entry "Chocolatte".

She lost the duel against Joan Franka with her song "You And Me" who then advanced to the final round and won the right to represent the country. Franka and her have known each other before as they have both participated on The Voice of Holland.

Discography

Albums

look at here

Singles

Trivia
NVPI, the Dutch certifier, certified the song gold three days after the finale of Idols. The single broke the record for gold ever reached in the Netherlands. At the time, 40.000 copies were the requirement for gold. Paton was given the price while she was on a popular talkshow called Jensen!, by Eric van Tijn, one of the judges during Idols.
A week after the final, Sony reported that the single had sold over 80,000 copies, certifying the single platinum.

References

External links

Another Official website
Raffaëla Fanclub

1983 births
Idols (TV series) winners
The Voice (franchise) contestants
Rhythm and blues musicians
Musicians from Amsterdam
Living people
Dutch people of Surinamese descent
English-language singers from the Netherlands
21st-century Dutch singers
21st-century Dutch women singers
Nationaal Songfestival contestants